General elections were held in Botswana on 16 October 2009, alongside local elections, with early voting in 26 polling stations abroad taking place 3 October. The result was a tenth successive victory for the Botswana Democratic Party, which won 45 of the 57 elected seats in the National Assembly.

Electoral system
The 57 directly-elected members of the National Assembly were elected in single-member constituencies. A further four members were elected from a list nominated by the President, whilst the President and Attorney General became ex officio members.

Campaign
The ruling BDP was suffering from internal problems leading up to the election, with President Ian Khama threatening to expel party leader and former cabinet minister Daniel Kwelagobe, who also led the rival Barata-Phathi faction within the BDP. Although Khama and Kwelagobe eventually reconciled, stability within the BDP remained in question. The BDP campaign focused on its record in government, including education, training and economic development.

Botswana National Front leader Otsweletse Moupo did not contest the elections after losing the party's primary elections for his Gaborone West North seat. It was speculated that he would stand for election in Gaborone South, but Moupo ultimately declined to run. The BNF campaign centred around creating a strong civil society and improving social welfare and housing.

The Botswana Congress Party (BCP) and the Botswana Alliance Movement (BAM) formed an electoral alliance and supported each other's candidates. BCP leader Gilson Saleshando stood for election in Selebi-Phikwe West, a constituency held prior to the election by BDP candidate Kavis Kario. The alliance's campaign included a pledge to stop the economic downturn.

The Botswana People's Party (BPP) campaign focused on agricultural development and manufacturing, whilst the MELS Movement of Botswana (MELS) promised to fight the exploitation of the population.

A total of 177 candidates contested the elections; 57 from the BDP, 48 from the BNF, 46 from the BCP-BAM alliance (42 from the BCP and 4 from the BAM), 6 from the BPP, 4 from MELS, one from the Botswana Tlhoko Tiro Organisation and 15 independents.

Opinion polls
Very few scientific opinion polls were taken prior to the election, preventing accurate measures of public sentiment.

Conduct
Early voting was planned for police and polling officers on 29 September, as they would be unable to vote on election day. However, because of a printing error at the Johannesburg-based printer that was responsible for printing the ballot papers, early voting could not proceed as planned; ballot numbers, which should be unique to counter election fraud, were sometimes repeated on the ballots for local elections. As a result Police officers and polling officers had to vote on 16 October, along with the general public. For officers stationed far away from the place they are registered to vote, this presented serious problems. The BCP threatened legal action against the Independent Electoral Commission.

Election turnout was reported to be high with polling station opening times being extending to cope with large queues.  Election observers stated that the overall process ran smoothly, although in some instance people had been unable to vote. The Southern African Development Community noted that the elections were "credible, peaceful, free and fair", but raised concerns about the "slow polling process".

Results

Nehemiah Modubule, MP for Lobatse, won re-election running as an independent, having been elected in 2004 as a BNF candidate.

Aftermath
The BDP held a victory rally in Gaborone on 18 October, and President Khama was sworn in for his first full term on 20 October.

See also
List of members of the National Assembly of Botswana 2009–2014

References

Botswana
2009 in Botswana
Elections in Botswana